South Korea competed as Republic of Korea at the 2006 Winter Olympics, while North Korea competed as the Democratic People's Republic of Korea. At the opening ceremony, the athletes of both North and South Korea entered the stadium together behind the Korean Unification Flag.

Medalists
 In terms of medal count, South Korea is the only Asian country in the top ten.
 Ten of the eleven medals were won in short track speed skating. Short track speedskaters Jin Sun-yu and Ahn Hyun-soo were the second and third people to win three gold medals each in Turin. Ahn also won a bronze.

Alpine skiing

Biathlon

Cross-country skiing 

Distance

Sprint

Freestyle skiing

Luge

Short track speed skating 

Men

Women

Skeleton

Ski jumping

Speed skating 

Men

Women

References

 

Korea, South
2006
Winter Olympics